Saint Vincent of Quebiawan Integrated School was established by the mayor of City of San Fernando, province of Pampanga, Philippines, to help poor students in the barangays of said location.

Schools in San Fernando, Pampanga